Thomas Hurd, CB, known as Tom Hurd, is the former head of the 'Joint Biosecurity Centre' announced by UK Prime Minister Boris Johnson in May 2020.

He held the position from May 2020 to June 2020, when he was replaced by Dr Clare Gardiner. Hurd was formerly the director general of the British Government's Office for Security and Counter-Terrorism.

Life
Hurd is the son of Douglas Hurd. He was educated at Eton College and Oxford University with Boris Johnson.

References

External links
https://www.linkedin.com/in/thomas-hurd-29a1231a

British civil servants
British diplomats
Living people
Year of birth missing (living people)
People educated at Eton College
Alumni of Pembroke College, Oxford
Credit Suisse people
Sons of life peers
Companions of the Order of the Bath